Aleksandr Popov, (born April 26, 1975) is an Uzbekistani sprint canoer who competed in the mid-1990s. Competing for Yugoslavia, he was eliminated in the repechages of the K-1 500 m event at the 1996 Summer Olympics in Atlanta.

External links
Sports-Reference.com profile

1975 births
Canoeists at the 1996 Summer Olympics
Living people
Olympic canoeists of Uzbekistan
Uzbekistani male canoeists